Ernest Whiteside (1 February 1889–1953) was an English footballer who played for Bolton Wanderers and Rochdale.

References

Rochdale A.F.C. players
Bolton Wanderers F.C. players
York City F.C. (1908) players
Halifax Town A.F.C. players
Shelbourne F.C. players
Fleetwood Town F.C. players
English footballers
1889 births
1953 deaths
People from Lytham St Annes
Association footballers not categorized by position